Dhamika Bulankulame (born 28 June 1965) is a Sri Lankan former first-class cricketer who played for Colts Cricket Club.

References

External links
 

1965 births
Living people
Sri Lankan cricketers
Colts Cricket Club cricketers
Sportspeople from Kandy